Angela Grant (born 1950) is a British actress, best known for her appearances in four Carry On films, including Carry On Up the Khyber and Carry On Girls. Prior to beginning her acting career, she was a teenage fashion model for Michael Whittaker. She now does public speaking and work for charity. She lives in Knightsbridge, London.

Selected filmography
 Follow That Camel (1967) - Harem Girl (uncredited)
 Carry On Up the Khyber (1968) - Hospitality Girl (uncredited)
 The Assassination Bureau (1969) - 'La Belle Amie' Girl (uncredited)
 Arthur? Arthur! (1969) - Cynthia
 Zeta One (1969) - Angvisa Girl
 Carry On Camping (1969) - Schoolgirl 
 Tales from the Crypt (1972) - Susan Blake (segment 2 "Reflection of Death")
 Carry On Girls (1973) - Miss Bangor
 Spectre (1977) - Butler
 What's Up Nurse! (1977) - Kim
 What's Up Superdoc! (1978) - Helen Arkwright
 The Zany Adventures of Robin Hood (1984) - Lady Exeter

External links

1950 births
British actresses
Living people
People from Knightsbridge